Sydney Smith defeated Arthur Gore 6–4, 4–6, 6–2, 6–1 in the All Comers' Final, but the reigning champion Reginald Doherty defeated Smith 6–8, 6–3, 6–1, 6–2 in the challenge round to win the gentlemen's singles tennis title at the 1900 Wimbledon Championships.

Draw

Challenge round

All comers' finals

Top half

Section 1

Section 2

Bottom half

Section 3

Section 4

References

External links

Gentlemen's Singles
Wimbledon Championship by year – Men's singles